The 1989 Georgia Tech Yellow Jackets football team represented the Georgia Institute of Technology during the 1989 NCAA Division I-A football season. The Yellow Jackets were led by third-year head coach Bobby Ross, and played their home games at Bobby Dodd Stadium in Atlanta, Georgia. They competed as members of the Atlantic Coast Conference, finishing tied for fourth. Despite winning seven of their last eight games and ending on a four-game winning streak, they were not invited to a bowl game.

Schedule

Sources:

Roster

References

Georgia Tech
Georgia Tech Yellow Jackets football seasons
Georgia Tech Yellow Jackets football